I Love Us is an American reality series that premiered on BET+ on June 2, 2022. The series is hosted by Kym Whitley and Kountry Wayne.

Episodes

References

External links

2020s American reality television series
2022 American television series debuts
BET+ original programming
English-language television shows